Jeremy A. Greene is the William H. Welch Professor of Medicine and the History of Medicine, at Johns Hopkins University.

Career 
Greene is a professor of Medicine and History of Medicine at Johns Hopkins School of Medicine. Greene has studied the generic drug industry.
His work appears in Slate.

Works
Prescribing by Numbers: Drugs and the Definition of Disease, Johns Hopkins University Press, 2008,

References

External links

Living people
Johns Hopkins University people
Place of birth missing (living people)
Year of birth missing (living people)